Kawayan (IPA: [kaʊ'aɪɐn]), officially the Municipality of Kawayan, is a 5th class municipality in the province of Biliran, Philippines. According to the 2020 census, it has a population of 20,455 people.

Geography
According to the Philippine Statistics Authority, the municipality has a land area of  constituting  of the  total area of Biliran.

Barangays
Kawayan is politically subdivided into 20 barangays. In 1948, the barangays of Ungale, Tuo, and Inasuyan were transferred from Caibiran, Biliran. Kawayan, like the Municipality of Biliran, is a melting pot for Waray and Cebuano-speakers. The municipality is linguistically divided into two languages, the people of the western part of the town that faces Almeria and Maripipi at a distance speaks Cebuano while the eastern part that faces Culaba speaks Waray.

Climate

Demographics

In the 2020 census, Kawayan had a population of 20,455.

Economy

References

External links
 [ Philippine Standard Geographic Code]

Municipalities of Biliran